Hugh II of Chalon-Arlay (1334–1388) was the son and successor as lord of Arlay to John II.  His mother was Marguerite of Mello (House of Mello, daughter of the lord of Château-Chinon and of Sainte-Hermine Dreux IV of Mello, and of Eleanor of Savoy, daughter of the duke of Aosta and count of Savoy Amadeus V).

In 1363 he married Blanche, Dame de Frontenay and daughter of Amadeus III, Count of Geneva.  He died without issue and so was succeeded by his nephew John III (son of Hugh II's brother Louis I of Chalon-Arlay).

1334 births
1388 deaths
Chalon-Arlay